Global Educational Excellence (GEE) is a charter school management company headquartered in Ann Arbor, Michigan. Mohamad Issa and Dr. Said Issa founded the company in 1998. As of 2015 it operates 11 schools in Michigan and Ohio in the United States and in the country of Jordan.

The company is for profit. As of 2005 its yearly revenue was $500,000.

In the fall of 2021, Eastern Michigan University announced that it would not renew the charter of Ann Arbor Learning Community (AALC), which was scheduled to expire in the summer of 2022, citing a steep drop in enrollment and other concerns.  AALC contended that it should not be penalized for the enrollment drop, alleging that GEE, as its management company, had falsely inflated AALC's enrollment figures to increase GEE's revenues. AALC terminated GEE's management contract, and GEE sued AALC for unpaid fees in the Washtenaw County Circuit Court.

Schools

Michigan
Ann Arbor:
 Central Academy

Dearborn:
 Riverside Academy West Campus (grades 6–12)
 Riverside Academy East Campus (K-5)
 Riverside Academy Early Childhood Center

Dearborn Heights:
 Global Heights Academy (K-5)

Detroit:
 Frontier International Academy (grades K-12)
 Bridge Academy West Campus
 GEE Edmonson Academy

Hamtramck:
 Bridge Academy East Campus (PreK-8)
 Gee Prep High School

Ypsilanti area:
 Global Tech Academy (PreK-5) - Ypsilanti Township

Ohio

 Central Academy of Ohio (K-6 school) -Toledo.

Jordan
 American Excellence School/ Jordan (PreK-8) - Amman

References

External links
 Global Educational Excellence 

Charter schools in Michigan
1998 establishments in Michigan
Educational institutions established in 1998
Companies based in Ann Arbor, Michigan